{{DISPLAYTITLE:2010 BK118}}

 (also written 2010 BK118) is a centaur roughly 20–60 km in diameter. It is on a retrograde cometary orbit. It has a barycentric semi-major axis (average distance from the Sun) of ~400 AU.

 came to perihelion in April 2012 at a distance of 6.1 AU from the Sun (outside the orbit of Jupiter). It has a Jupiter-MOID of 1.1 AU. , it is 11 AU from the Sun.

It will not be 50 AU from the Sun until 2043. After leaving the planetary region of the Solar System,  will have a barycentric aphelion of 791 AU with an orbital period of 8000 years.

Notes

References

External links 
 
 

Trans-Neptunian objects
Inner Oort cloud
Minor planet object articles (unnumbered)
Astronomical objects discovered in 2010
Minor planets with a retrograde orbit